Leon's Centre (formerly K-Rock Centre, and Rogers K-Rock Centre) is an indoor arena in downtown Kingston, Ontario. Opened in 2008, it is the home of the Kingston Frontenacs of the Ontario Hockey League.

History

The arena was designed by Brisbin Brook Beynon Architects, and was constructed by EllisDon Construction. It was built on city-owned land known as the "North Block", which at the time was being used as a parking lot. An archaeological dig of the area was necessary since the southeast portion of the site was the former location of part of the historic Fort Frontenac. The remaining ruins of the fort's northwest bastion is located directly across the street from the main entrance.

The groundbreaking ceremony took place July 28, 2006, with construction beginning on November 3, 2006. On February 6, 2008, local radio station CIKR-FM (K-Rock) purchased the naming rights to the arena for 10 years at $3.3 million. After Rogers Communications acquired ownership of CIKR-FM, the arena was officially renamed Rogers K-Rock Centre on August 14, 2013.

In 2012, Kingston City Council voted to rename the street on which the arena is located, formerly a part of Barrack Street, to The Tragically Hip Way in honour of Kingston band The Tragically Hip.

In 2018, furniture store chain Leon's, represented by the owner of its local location, acquired the naming rights under a 5-year deal, valued at $257,000 per-year.

Concerts
The inaugural concert at Leon's Centre was performed by The Tragically Hip on February 23, 2008. The arena has since hosted several concerts and entertainment events by artists including Elton John, Avril Lavigne, Neil Young, Cirque du Soleil, Deadmau5, Jerry Seinfeld, Bryan Adams, Bob Dylan, Willie Nelson, Carrie Underwood, Brooks & Dunn, Leonard Cohen, Reba McEntire, Billy Talent, and Sting among many others.

On August 20, 2016, The Tragically Hip played the final concert of their Man Machine Poem Tour at Leon's Centre (then Rogers K-Rock Centre) with the Prime Minister of Canada, Justin Trudeau, in attendance. The tour was announced after it was made public that lead singer Gord Downie had been diagnosed with terminal brain cancer. The concert was broadcast by the CBC's radio, television, and digital platforms under the title The Tragically Hip: A National Celebration.

Sports

The Kingston Frontenacs played their first game at their new home on February 22, 2008.  Don Cherry dropped the puck for the ceremonial face off prior to the game. The Frontenacs dropped their first game in front of over 5,700 fans, losing 3–2 to their rivals, the Belleville Bulls. Two days later, the Fronts earned their first win at the Leon's Centre, defeating the Peterborough Petes 7–4.

October 28 to 31, 2010, the City of Kingston played host to the 2010 Skate Canada International, an ISU Grand Prix of Figure Skating event. This was the first major international sporting event to be hosted at the rink, and was broadcast across the world.

From February 16 to 24, 2013, Leon's Centre hosted the 2013 Scotties Tournament of Hearts, the Canadian women's national curling championship; becoming the first Ontario city to host the event since Sault Ste. Marie in 2010. In the tournament, Rachel Homan from Ontario defeated former Scotties champion Jennifer Jones 9–6 in the final game. Total attendance for the event was over 65,000.

The arena hosted the 2015 Canadian Figure Skating Championships between January 19 and 25, 2015.

From February 29 to March 8, 2020, Leon's Centre hosted the 2020 Tim Hortons Brier, the Canadian men's national curling championship; commemorating the 200th anniversary of Kingston's first organized curling game. The Brier was held in Kingston for the first time since 1957.

Kingston and District Sports Hall of Fame
The Kingston and District Sports Hall of Fame is located in the Leon's Centre. The hall of fame honors any athlete or "builder of sport" (such as a coach) who has contributed meaningfully to sports in Kingston. Athletes must be retired from the sport for which they are nominated for at least three years or be older than 50. Builders are eligible at any time. The hall officially opened in 1996, and in 2008, it moved into the K-Rock Centre (now Leon's Centre).

References

External links

Leon's Centre website
Kingston and District Sports Hall of Fame

Indoor arenas in Ontario
Indoor ice hockey venues in Canada
Ontario Hockey League arenas
Sports venues in Kingston, Ontario
Music venues in Ontario